Willem Wakker (8 December 1879 – 20 November 1959) was a Dutch long-distance runner. He competed in the men's marathon at the 1908 Summer Olympics.

References

External links
 

1879 births
1959 deaths
Athletes (track and field) at the 1908 Summer Olympics
Dutch male long-distance runners
Dutch male marathon runners
Olympic athletes of the Netherlands
Place of birth missing